Melanie Janene Thornton (May 13, 1967 – November 24, 2001) was an American pop and dance music singer. She was the lead singer of the Eurodance group La Bouche from 1994 to 2000, alongside American rapper Lane McCray. Their two most successful singles, "Sweet Dreams" and "Be My Lover", were released in 1994 and 1995 respectively. After leaving the group, Thornton began a solo career and found success primarily in European countries before her death in 2001. Her solo songs include "Love How You Love Me", "Heartbeat", "Makin' Oooh Oooh (Talking About Love)" and "Wonderful Dream (Holidays are Coming)".

On the night of November 24, 2001, shortly after the final performance in Leipzig, Thornton was among the 24 people that were killed in the crash of Swiss airline's Crossair Flight 3597 in Bassersdorf, Switzerland.

Career

1967–1990: Early life
Thornton was born in Charleston, South Carolina and began studying voice from the age of six, as well as learning to play the piano and the clarinet. Inspired by singers whom she idolized and grew up listening to such as Aretha Franklin and Roberta Flack, Thornton would mimic the female vocalists she watched on television and/or heard on radio. Later on, she financed her college studies with appearances in talent shows and smaller band concerts. Throughout that period, she frequented a club called The Peacock Lounge, getting up and doing jam sessions when the live band invited people up to sing.

1991–1994: Career beginnings
She had long dreamed of a career in music and in February 1991, Thornton went to Germany. Her sister lived there with her U.S. Army husband and Thornton had dual citizenship in Germany and the United States. Her uncle, Bob Chisolm, a singer and piano player, encouraged her to give the German nightclub circuit a try. She had been singing in a Macon, Ga., band, Danger Zone, pulling down $50 on a good night. However, Bob Chisolm told her that on a bad night in Germany she would make $150. Thornton provided guest vocals for a lot of dance projects on their single releases, such as Orange Blue's "If You Wanna Be (My Only)", Comic's "I Surrender to Your Love", 100%'s "Power of the Light", Trance-Vision's "Take Me 2 Heaven 2 Nite" or Men Behind's "Feel the life" and "How Can I."

1994–1999: La Bouche and "Sweet Dreams"

Thornton tried it and soon found work in studios recording demos. It was her recording of the song "Sweet Dreams" that caught the attention of producer Frank Farian, the mastermind of the infamous 1980s duo Milli Vanilli. Farian took her under his wing, teaming her with rapper Lane McCray in the duo La Bouche, which is French for "The Mouth". La Bouche went on to become one of the biggest Eurodance groups of the 1990s, with a string of hits, worldwide. They released two studio albums "Sweet Dreams" and "S.O.S.", with "A Moment of Love" being the European version of "S.O.S.", the remix album "All Mixed Up" followed by a string of hits like "Sweet Dreams (Ola Ola E)", "Be My Lover", "Fallin' in Love", "I Love to Love", "Bolingo (Love is in the Air)", "You Won't Forget Me" or "S.O.S."  In February 2000, she would leave La Bouche to be replaced by Natascha Wright as the new front-woman. Next to La Bouche, Thornton continued providing guest vocals on singles such as Orange Blue's "Sunshine of My Life" and "Runaway", 100%'s "The Way It Is" and on Le Click's U.S. chart debut "Tonight is the Night" in 1995.

2000–2001: "Ready to Fly"
She signed a record deal with Sony/Epic Records. Her first solo single was released in November 2000, titled "Love How You Love Me", a ballad (the CD-maxi includes a few dance remixes). Thornton presented her new single on November 29, 2000, on the RTL Spendenmarathon, and on December 1 at the Dome in Berlin. The follow-up singles were "Heartbeat" in March 2001, and "Makin' Oooh Oooh (Talking About Love)" in September 2001. On May 7, 2001, Thornton released her first (and only) solo album entitled Ready to Fly under the label X-Cell, distributed by Sony/Epic Records. The album featured a mixture of soul and dance tracks that showed off her powerful voice. There was also a special edition of the album released later on November 26, 2001, featuring some remix bonus tracks and bonus songs such as the single "Wonderful Dream (Holidays Are Coming)". Thornton continued to do club appearances in the United States under the billing "Melanie Thornton, formerly of La Bouche". She was featured on Joy-Lab's single release "Freedom (Free Your Mind)" in 2001.

Death

On the night of November 24, 2001, Thornton died in the crash of Crossair Flight 3597 near Zürich, Switzerland, at the age of 34. Thornton had given her final performance in Leipzig and immediately afterwards took the flight from Berlin to Zürich for upcoming radio and TV appearances (among others, the broadcast Die Bar on TV3, which was cancelled) to promote her new single "Wonderful Dream (Holidays Are Coming)" (a Christmas ballad recorded for a German Coca-Cola TV commercial) and her album Ready to Fly. 
Thornton was laid to final rest in her native South Carolina, at Mount Pleasant Memorial Gardens, in Mount Pleasant, Charleston County, South Carolina.

Aftermath and posthumous releases
Although Thornton's death occurred on the eve of the Christmas season, Coca-Cola decided to stick with the commercial as planned. The original commercial has been aired in Germany every year since 2001 around Christmas time, and the song has been in the German single charts every year since. It has also aired in several other countries. On November 25, 2002, the single "In Your Life" by La Bouche with Thornton, returning posthumously on lead vocals, was released to commemorate the first anniversary of her death. Included is an "in memory" dedication from Lane McCray and SonyBmg/X-Cell Records. The single has been included in the first La Bouche "Best of" compilation (Credited as "La Bouche feat. Melanie Thornton") on May 21, 2002. On December 1, 2003, another remix compilation called "Memories – Her Most Beautiful Ballads" has been released containing her ballads and songs in acoustic ballad versions. On April 2, 2007, the second La Bouche compilation "Greatest Hits" has been released.

Discography

Studio albums

Compilation albums
 1996: All Mixed Up (La Bouche Remix Album) (December 16, 1996)
 2002: Best of (Credited as "La Bouche feat. Melanie Thornton") (May 21, 2002)
 2003: Memories – Her Most Beautiful Ballads (December 1, 2003)
 2007: Greatest Hits (La Bouche) (April 2, 2007)

Singles

Singles (as featured artist) 
 1993: Feel the Life (Men Behind feat. Melanie Thornton)
 1994: If You Wanna Be (My Only) (Orange Blue feat. Melanie Thornton)
 1994: I Surrender to Your Love (Comic feat. Melanie Thornton)
 1994: Power of the Light (100% feat. Melanie Thornton)
 1994: Take Me 2 Heaven 2 Nite (Trance-Vision feat. Melanie Thornton)
 1994: How Can I (Men Behind feat. Melanie Thornton)
 1994: Nobody (Hysterie feat. Melanie Thornton)
 1994: Tonight Is the Night (Le Click feat. Melanie Thornton)
 1994: Freedom (Free Your Mind) (Joy-Lab feat. Melanie Thornton)
 1995: Skate with me (Loop feat. Katarina Witt, Melanie Thornton, Joan Faulkner & Linda Rocco)

References

Literature
 Lois Chisolm: Sweet Dreams Fulfilled: The Melanie Thornton Story. Lois Thornton Chisolm, 2012.

External links

 
 Melanie Thornton Youth Arts Foundation teaching children creative arts
 Dance artist info page on the singer
 English/German Melanie Thornton & La Bouche Website

 Image page featuring stills from her final concerts, in German

1967 births
2001 deaths
20th-century African-American women singers
American expatriates in Germany
American expatriates in Switzerland
American house musicians
American women pop singers
Eurodance musicians
Musicians from Charleston, South Carolina
Musicians killed in aviation accidents or incidents
Victims of aviation accidents or incidents in Switzerland
Victims of aviation accidents or incidents in 2001